Kia Vaughn (born January 24, 1987) is an American-born Czech former professional basketball player. She last played for the Atlanta Dream of the Women's National Basketball Association (WNBA) She attended high school at St. Michael's All Girls High School in New York, and later went on to star at Rutgers University.

High school
Born in the Bronx, New York, Vaughn played for St. Michael Academy in New York City, where she was named a WBCA All-American.  Her father Linzell "Predator" Vaughn is a noted street ball player at Rucker Park.   She participated in the 2005 WBCA High School All-America Game where she scored two points.

College
Vaughn attended Rutgers University from 2006 to 2009, playing under legendary coach C. Vivian Stringer. She helped Rutgers to a perfect 16–0 record in the Big East conference her freshman year, averaging 6.3 points per game and 7 rebounds a game. During her sophomore season, she was named the All-Met Division I Women's College Basketball Player of the Year. She averaged 12.8 points per game, 9.3 rebounds per game, and 2.5 blocks per game. That year, she helped lead the Rutgers women's basketball team to a Big East Conference championship. The Lady Scarlet Knights lost to the Tennessee Lady Vols in the NCAA championship game.

Vaughn continued to excel in her junior season, garnering Metropolitan Basketball Writers Association All-Met First Team honors along with being named to the All Big-East second team. She averaged 10 points per game and 8.2 rebounds per game on the season. Her senior campaign was solid, but a little underwhelming as she averaged only 9.7 points per game 6.7 rebounds per game.  Nevertheless, she was named All-Big East Honorable Mention at the season's conclusion.

Rutgers statistics
Source

USA Basketball
Vaughn was also a member of the Championship winning 2006 USA National Team FIBA Americas U20 Championship for Women in Mexico City, Mexico. Kia averaged 12 points and 3 rebounds in 5 games.

Professional career

WNBA
Vaughn was drafted 8th overall in the 2009 WNBA Draft by her home state team, the New York Liberty. In her first two seasons with the Liberty, she was a reserve on the team's roster. In her third season with the Liberty, she was the starting center for the team and averaged career-highs in scoring and rebounding. For these efforts, she would win the 2011 WNBA Most Improved Player Award. In her fourth season with the Liberty, Vaughn became a role player on the roster, playing 31 games with 17 starts. Upon the 2013 season, Vaughn was a restricted free agent and was traded to the Washington Mystics along with a 2013 first round pick in exchange for the seventh overall pick in the 2013 WNBA Draft.

In her first season with the Mystics, she was a role player on the roster and then would be upgraded in the Mystics' starting lineup the following year at the five spot. In 2015, Vaughn would have an injury-riddled season, she missed the first half of the season due to a concussion, she made her return in the beginning of August and played 20 games. In the 2016 season, Vaughn would be fully healthy, playing all 34 games with 4 starts. In January 2017, the New York Liberty re-acquired Vaughan in a three-team trade deal that sent teammate Bria Hartley also to the Liberty, Carolyn Swords along with the 15th overall pick in the 2017 WNBA draft to the Seattle Storm and the Mystics receiving two 2017 first round draft picks from the Storm.

In February 2018, Vaughn re-signed with the Liberty.

Vaughn did not play in the 2019 WNBA season, choosing to focus on her season in Turkey.

Vaughn signed with the Phoenix Mercury for the 2020 season. She would re-sign with the team in 2021.

On August 14, 2022, Vaughn announced her retirement.

Overseas
From 2012 to 2015, Vaughn played three off-seasons in Czech Republic for ZVVZ USK Praha. In August 2016, Vaughn re-signed with ZVVZ USK Praha for the 2016-17 WNBA off-season In September 2017, Vaughed signed with Fenerbahçe Istanbul of the Turkish Super League for the 2017-18 off-season.

WNBA career statistics

Regular season

|-
| style="text-align:left;"| 2009
| style="text-align:left;"| New York
| 34 || 1 || 11.6 || .493 || .000 || .500 || 2.6 || 0.2 || 0.2 || 0.1 || 0.9 || 4.8
|-
| style="text-align:left;"| 2010
| style="text-align:left;"| New York
| 30 || 0 || 8.1 || .348 || 1.000 || .650 || 1.4 || 0.3 || 0.2 || 0.2 || 0.6 || 2.1
|-
| style="text-align:left;"| 2011
| style="text-align:left;"| New York
| 34 || 34 || 28.1 || .497 || .000 || .786 || 6.7 || 1.1 || 1.2 || 0.7 || 1.8 || 10.1
|-
| style="text-align:left;"| 2012
| style="text-align:left;"| New York
| 31 || 17 || 22.9 || .430 || .000 || .656 || 5.0 || 0.9 || 0.5 || 0.8 || 1.0 || 6.5
|-
| style="text-align:left;"| 2013
| style="text-align:left;"| Washington
| 34 || 15 || 20.0 || .425 || .000 || .761 || 5.2 || 0.6 || 0.7 || 1.1 || 1.5 || 6.9
|-
| style="text-align:left;"| 2014
| style="text-align:left;"| Washington
| 33 || 33 || 24.1 || .458 || .000 || .634 || 6.3 || 1.2 || 0.9 || 0.5 || 1.4 || 9.0
|-
| style="text-align:left;"| 2015
| style="text-align:left;"| Washington
| 20 || 1 || 17.8 || .451 || .000 || .667 || 4.2 || 1.0 || 0.4 || 0.4 || 1.3 || 5.7
|-
| style="text-align:left;"| 2016
| style="text-align:left;"| Washington
| 34 || 4 || 19.8 || .503 || .000 || .750 || 4.3 || 0.6 || 0.6 || 0.5 || 0.9 || 6.3
|-
| style="text-align:left;"| 2017
| style="text-align:left;"| New York
| 28 || 22 || 19.6 || .536 || .000 || .583 || 4.9 || 0.7 || 0.4 || 0.4 || 0.8 || 5.8
|-
| style="text-align:left;"| 2018
| style="text-align:left;"| New York
| 29 || 27 || 18.3 || .533 || .000 || .643 || 4.0 || 0.7 || 0.7 || 0.2 || 1.0 || 5.7
|-
| style="text-align:left;"| 2020
| style="text-align:left;"| Phoenix
| 22 || 10 || 18.9 || .488 || .000 || .579 || 3.6 || 1.5 || 0.5 || 0.3 || 1.5 || 6.1
|-
| style="text-align:left;"| 2021
| style="text-align:left;"| Phoenix
| 28 || 2 || 15.8 || .444 || .000 || .600 || 2.7 || 1.3 || 0.2 || 0.2 || 1.3 || 4.6
|-
| style="text-align:left;"| 2022
| style="text-align:left;"| Atlanta
| 29 || 1 || 13.8 || .400 || .000 || .692 || 3.2 || 0.9 || 0.3 || 0.3 || 1.1 || 2.5
|-
| style="text-align:left;"| Career
| style="text-align:left;"| 13 years, 4 teams
| 386 || 167 || 18.5 || .468 || .100 || .668 || 4.2 || 0.8 || 0.5 || 0.5 || 1.2 || 5.9

Playoffs

|-
| style="text-align:left;"| 2010
| style="text-align:left;"| New York
| 5 || 0 || 15.6 || .625 || .000 || .462 || 3.0 || 0.6 || 0.0 || 0.6 || 1.0 || 5.2
|-
| style="text-align:left;"| 2011
| style="text-align:left;"| New York
| 3 || 3 || 26.0 || .571 || .000 || .900 || 6.3 || 1.3 || 1.0 || 0.3 || 1.0 || 8.3
|-
| style="text-align:left;"| 2012
| style="text-align:left;"| New York
| 2 || 0 || 22.5 || .417 || .000 || 1.000 || 8.5 || 1.0 || 0.0 || 0.5 || 1.5 || 5.5
|-
| style="text-align:left;"| 2013
| style="text-align:left;"| Washington
| 3 || 3 || 24.7 || .462 || .000 || .000 || 5.0 || 0.7 || 0.7 || 0.7 || 1.3 || 8.0
|-
| style="text-align:left;"| 2014
| style="text-align:left;"| Washington
| 2 || 2 || 23.0 || .300 || .000 || .500 || 5.0 || 0.5 || 0.5 || 0.0 || 2.0 || 3.5
|-
| style="text-align:left;"| 2015
| style="text-align:left;"| Washington
| 3 || 0 || 16.7 || .538 || .000 || .833 || 4.3 || 0.3 || 0.0 || 0.0 || 0.7 || 6.3
|-
| style="text-align:left;"| 2017
| style="text-align:left;"| New York
| 1 || 1 || 15.0 || .000 || .000 || .000 || 5.0 || 0.0 || 0.0 || 0.0 || 2.0 || 0.0
|-
| style="text-align:left;"| 2020
| style="text-align:left;"| Phoenix
| 2 || 2 || 31.5 || .478 || .000 || .000 || 6.0 || 0.5 || 0.0 || 0.0 || 1.0 || 11.0
|-
| style="text-align:left;"| 2021
| style="text-align:left;"| Phoenix
| 11 || 0 || 12.8|| .288 || .000 || 1.000 || 2.2 || 1.2 || 0.4 || 0.0 || 1.1 || 2.9
|-
| style="text-align:left;"| Career
| style="text-align:left;"| 9 years, 3 teams
| 32 || 11 || 18.4 || .423 || .000 || .706 || 4.1 || 0.8 || 0.3 || 0.2 || 1.2 || 5.2

Litigation
On August 14, 2007 Vaughn, one of the women involved in the controversial remarks made earlier that year by Don Imus and his producer Bernard McGuirk, filed suit against Imus, McGuirk, NBC Universal, CBS Corporation, MSNBC, CBS Radio, Viacom, Westwood One radio, citing slander, libel, and defamation of character. Vaughn was the only player to pursue legal damages brought on by the controversy. Vaughn dropped the lawsuit against Imus on September 11, 2007, citing her desire to "concentrate on her studies and basketball training."

References

1987 births
Living people
Czech women's basketball players
American women's basketball players
American emigrants to the Czech Republic
American expatriate basketball people in the Czech Republic
American expatriate basketball people in Turkey
Centers (basketball)
Basketball players from New York City
Fenerbahçe women's basketball players
New York Liberty draft picks
New York Liberty players
Parade High School All-Americans (girls' basketball)
Atlanta Dream players
Phoenix Mercury players
Rutgers Scarlet Knights women's basketball players
Sportspeople from the Bronx
Washington Mystics players